Etelä-Saimaa is a morning broadsheet daily newspaper published in Finland.

History and profile
Etelä-Saimaa was established in 1885. The paper is published by Sanoma Lehtimedia Oy which also publishes Kouvolan Sanomat, Kymen Sanomat and Uutisvuoksi.

Its circulation was 29,424 copies in 2011.

References

External links
Official site

1885 establishments in the Russian Empire
Daily newspapers published in Finland
Finnish-language newspapers
Publications established in 1885